Trevor Dodds may refer to:

 Trevor Dodds (born 1959), Namibian professional golfer
 Trevor Dodds (curler), Scottish curler